The Xenos is a light, aluminum, low-wing, two seat homebuilt aircraft, that can be registered as a motor glider or a light-sport aircraft (ELSA). Kits are produced and marketed by Sonex Aircraft, a small manufacturer based in Oshkosh, Wisconsin.

Design and development
The Xenos motor glider is an evolution of the Monnett Moni motor glider.

After the introduction of the original Xenos model, the Xenos-B model was introduced in January 2017. Shipments of the "B" model began in March 2017. In response to customer demand, the "B" model included modifications that had already been incorporated into the Sonex and Waiex "B" models. The modifications included enlarging the fuselage to provide more shoulder, hip, knee and foot room. Also, the seat was moved back and staggered seating can be added by the use of seat cushions.

Specifications (Xenos-B)

References

External links

2000s United States sport aircraft
Homebuilt aircraft
Light-sport aircraft
Monnett aircraft
V-tail aircraft
Single-engined tractor aircraft
Xenos
Low-wing aircraft